A Place to Live is a Canadian drama film, directed by Bernard Émond and released in 2018. The film stars Élise Guilbault as Monique, a recently widowed woman who, while visiting her adult children in Montreal, decides to return to her childhood hometown of Verner, Ontario for the first time in many years.

In addition to Montreal and Verner, parts of the film were shot in Baie-Comeau, Tadoussac and Sudbury.

The film was Guilbault's fourth time appearing in Émond's films, following The Woman Who Drinks (La Femme qui boit), The Novena (La Neuvaine) and The Legacy (La Donation). Guilbault received a Prix Iris nomination for Best Actress for her work in the film.

References

External links

2018 films
Canadian drama films
Films shot in Montreal
Films shot in Greater Sudbury
Films directed by Bernard Émond
Films set in Northern Ontario
Films about widowhood
French-language Canadian films
2010s Canadian films